is a Japanese anime television series produced by Doga Kobo and directed by Yoshiyuki Fujiwara. The story was conceived by Naotaka Hayashi, who also wrote the screenplay, with original character designs by Okiura. The series aired in Japan between April 5 and June 28, 2015.

Plot
Plastic Memories takes place in a city (modeled after Singapore) in the near future, in which humans live alongside androids that look exactly like humans and have human emotion and memory. SAI Corp, the leading android production company, has introduced the Giftia, an advanced android model with the most human-like qualities of any model. However, there is a catch. The lifespan of a Giftia is determined beforehand, and a Giftia can only live for a maximum of 81,920 hours (roughly nine years and four months). If they pass their expiration date, it causes personality disintegration, memory loss, and outbreaks of violence; those who experience this are known as wanderers. Wanderers only act on instinct and can no longer recognize their owners. As a result, the Terminal Services are established with the duty of retrieving Giftias who are close to the end of their lifespans from their owners, and erasing the Giftias' memories. To perform this job, the Terminal Service employees work in teams consisting of a human (called a "spotter") and a Giftia (called a "marksman"). The story follows the work and life of such a team in SAI Corp's Terminal Service One office, the human protagonist Tsukasa Mizugaki and a Giftia named Isla. Their relationship progresses, and as they both slowly fall in love, Isla is revealed to be nearing the end of her own lifespan.

Characters

Terminal Service One

Tsukasa is the 18-year-old male protagonist. After failing his college entrance exams due to medical problems, he eventually gets a job through his father on Terminal Service One, although he initially does not know what they do. He is assigned as Isla's spotter and soon becomes attached to her, unaware that she is at the end of her lifespan. When he finally finds out, he refuses to abandon Isla and continues to be her partner. He has developed feelings for Isla ever since their first encounter, but only realizes it during their partnership.

Isla is a Giftia who is a beautiful young girl with long silver hair tied into twintails. She has a tendency to trip and fall on objects, and causes those around her to feel the fleetingness of life. She is said to be a veteran at the department and was once partnered with Kazuki as her marksman. After that, all she does is serve tea at SAI Corp, until Tsukasa arrives, to which she becomes his marksman and is put back in the field again, despite having less than 2,000 hours until the end of her lifespan. She eventually develops feelings for Tsukasa.

A 17-year-old employee who works at SAI Terminal Service One and is Tsukasa's superior by one year. She seems to be developing feelings for Tsukasa, but refuses to admit it. She was raised by a Giftia, so she empathizes with the "android children", people who were raised by Giftia or other androids. She had tried to protect her guardian from being retrieved, resulting in him becoming a "Wanderer", and he was later shot down by members of the private security firm R. Security, resulting in her longstanding hatred of them. This experience has since resulted in her joining Terminal Service One.

A Giftia with the appearance of a high-class young boy. He is Michiru's marksman. He loves to tease people around him and reveal their innermost secrets.

Tsukasa's boss at SAI Terminal Service One. She was once Isla's spotter and is highly protective of her former partner, being downright scary to her coworkers. She seems to be weak to alcohol, and has an amputated leg that was the result of an attempt to retrieve Michiru's father three years ago.

A Giftia who works at SAI Terminal Service One. He is Kazuki's current marksman and is known for his gentle personality.

A veteran employee at SAI Terminal Service One, where he has been working for ten years. He has a casual attitude and a lack of motivation, which is unusual for someone with his experience at the Terminal Service.

A Giftia who is Yasutaka's marksman. She has a serious personality and the appearance of a career woman. She tends to get annoyed at her partner's attitude and that he sometimes skips work. When angered, she can be as scary as Kazuki.

An employee at Terminal Service One. He is described by Zack as a "pencil pusher".

An engineer in the Giftia maintenance team, who has been on the job for only two years. She is also an "android geek" who particularly dotes on Isla. Her friend, a Giftia named Olivia, was retrieved years ago, but had her OS replaced and is now living a new life as Terminal Service No. 3 marksman Andie, much to Eru's initial dismay.

The section manager of SAI Terminal Service One. He originally had a job in sales, and as a result, he doesn't have any actual field experience with his current job. He seems to have trouble communicating with his daughter.

Eru's supervisor and the head of the Unit Testing Room, which is designed to measure the physical skills of a Giftia.

Other characters

A stern elderly woman who was raising Nina, a Giftia, as her surrogate granddaughter.

A Giftia raised by Chizu.

A young "android child" who was raised by Marcia, his family's Giftia. He is initially distrustful towards Giftias due to Marcia's impending retrieval and is willing to let Marcia go, but regains his love for her at the prodding of Tsukasa, Isla, and Michiru.

A Giftia who has raised Souta in the role of an older sister.

A unit supervisor for R. Security, tasked with hunting down Giftias who turn into Wanderers after passing their expiration dates.

A marksman from the Terminal Service No. 3 office. She was once Olivia, a neighbor and friend of Eru's, but was retrieved by the Terminal Service. However, due to budget cuts, her OS was instead replaced and she was recycled under her current name.

A mafia boss who owned Sarah and had her serve as his bodyguard. Coming to care for Sarah, he realized that his lifestyle was preventing her from living a normal life and sought to find a playmate for her.

A Giftia who was employed by Antonio as his bodyguard for years. The two became close and she also took on the role of Antonio's surrogate granddaughter.

Media

Anime
The 13-episode anime television series is produced by Doga Kobo and is directed by Yoshiyuki Fujiwara. The series was created and written by Naotaka Hayashi, and the music is produced by Mages. Okiura provides original character designs, which were later adapted by Chiaki Nakajima for the anime, while the backgrounds are made by Atelier Rourke 07, Gachi Production, and Nara Animation. The series aired from April 5 to June 28, 2015, on Tokyo MX. It aired on later dates on GYT, GTV, ABC, GBS, MTV, BS11, and AT-X. It also started broadcasting online on Niconico starting April 9, 2015. The first and seventh episodes feature the insert song "Again & Again" by Melody Chubak. The eighth episode uses "Ring of Fortune" as the ending theme instead of the opening theme. The tenth episode features an insert song sung by Isla's voice actress Sora Amamiya, titled .

Crunchyroll streams the series in North America, Central America, South America, and Europe excluding the United Kingdom, Republic of Ireland, Germany, Austria, and Liechtenstein. Funimation streams the series in United States and Canada with subtitles.

Episode list

Manga
A spin-off manga adaptation, illustrated by Yūyū and titled , features Michiru Kinushima as the protagonist. It began serialization in the June 2015 issue of ASCII Media Works' Dengeki G's Comic. The first tankōbon volume, which contains chapters published before the serialization, was published on April 27, 2015.

Volume list

Video game
A video game adaptation developed by 5pb. for the PlayStation Vita was released in Japan on October 13, 2016.

References

External links
  
  
 Plastic Memories: Say to Good-bye at ComicWalker 
 Plastic Memories at 5pb. 
 

Anime with original screenplays
ASCII Media Works manga
Aniplex
Comedy-drama anime and manga
Kadokawa Dwango franchises
Seinen manga
Tokyo MX original programming
Asahi Broadcasting Corporation original programming
Visual novels
PlayStation Vita games
Romance anime and manga
Science fiction anime and manga
2016 video games
Video games developed in Japan
Doga Kobo